The Sweden women's national under-16 basketball team is the national women's basketball team that represents Sweden in international under-16 tournaments. The team is controlled by the Svenska Basketbollförbundet.

FIBA U16 Women's European Championship participations

See also
Sweden women's national basketball team
Sweden women's national under-19 basketball team
Sweden men's national under-16 basketball team

References

External links
Official website 
Archived records of Sweden team participations

Basketball in Sweden
B
Women's national under-16 basketball teams